Taivo is an Estonian masculine given name.

As of 1 January 2021, 926 men in Estonia bear the name Taivo, making it the 178th most popular male name in the country. The name is the most popular in Põlva County, where there 16.16 per 10,000 inhabitants of the county bear the name. 

Individuals bearing the name Taivo include:
Taivo Arak (1946–2007), mathematician
Taivo Kastepõld (1942–2019), ornithologist
Taivo Kuus (born 1969), cross-country skier
Taivo Linna (1941–1996), musician and artist
Taivo Mägi (born 1960), track and field athlete and coach
Taivo Rist (born 1971), draughts player and science fiction writer

References

Masculine given names
Estonian masculine given names